Ioannis Nembidis (10 March 1928 – 6 November 2000) was a Greek footballer. He played in seven matches for the Greece national football team from 1949 to 1958. He was also named in Greece's squad for the Group 10 qualification tournament for the 1954 FIFA World Cup.

References

1928 births
2000 deaths
Greek footballers
Greece international footballers
Place of birth missing
Association footballers not categorized by position